Jocelyn Ducloux (born 22 August 1974 in Le Creusot, France) is a footballer currently playing for Championnat de France amateur side FC Montceau Bourgogne. He plays as a defensive midfielder.

Before joining Montceau, Ducloux spent nine seasons with Louhans-Cuiseaux, four of which were in Division 2 (now called Ligue 2), and four seasons, all of which in Ligue 2, for Niort.

References
Jocelyn Ducloux profile at chamoisfc79.fr

1974 births
Living people
French footballers
Association football midfielders
Louhans-Cuiseaux FC players
Chamois Niortais F.C. players
Ligue 2 players
FC Montceau Bourgogne players
Sportspeople from Le Creusot
Footballers from Bourgogne-Franche-Comté